Oscar A. Moore–Costa Kittles Field is a baseball venue in Tallahassee, Florida, United States.  It is home to the Florida A&M Rattlers baseball team of the NCAA Division I Mid-Eastern Athletic Conference. Built in 1983, it has a capacity of 500 spectators.  It features a natural grass surface, stadium lighting, dugouts, and a press box.

It is named for former Florida A&M baseball coaches Oscar A. Moore and Costa Kittles.  Combined, the coaches won over 500 games and 14 conference titles.  Moore was inducted into the university's athletic Hall of Fame in 1978, as was Kittles in 1982.

See also
 List of NCAA Division I baseball venues

References 

College baseball venues in the United States
Baseball venues in Florida
Florida A&M Rattlers baseball